Damani Dam, is an earth-fill type dam on the Mbwedi River, near Thohoyandou (former capital of Venda), Limpopo, South Africa. It was established in 1991. Its primary purpose is for industrial and municipal usage. Its hazard potential has been ranked as significant.

See also
List of reservoirs and dams in South Africa
List of rivers of South Africa

References 

 List of South African Dams from the Department of Water Affairs and Forestry (South Africa)

Dams in South Africa
Dams completed in 1991
1991 establishments in South Africa
Buildings and structures in Limpopo